WEC 9: Cold Blooded was a mixed martial arts event promoted by World Extreme Cagefighting on January 16, 2004, at the Palace Indian Gaming Center in Lemoore, California. The main event saw Mike Kyle take on Jude Hargett.

Results

See also 
 World Extreme Cagefighting
 List of WEC champions
 List of WEC events
 2004 in WEC

External links
 WEC 9 Results at Sherdog.com

World Extreme Cagefighting events
2004 in mixed martial arts
Mixed martial arts in California
Sports in Lemoore, California
2004 in sports in California